Leupold is a surname, and may refer to:

 Bertha Henry Buxton, née Leupold (1844 - 1881), a British novelist and children's author
 Dagmar Leupold (born 1955), German writer
 Hans Leupold (? - 1528), German preacher
 Harald Leupold-Löwenthal (1926, Vienna - 2007), Austrian doctor
 Herbert Leupold (1908 - 1942), German cross country skier
 Hermann Leupold (born: Karel Vanek; 1900 - 1967), German editor
 Horst "Leo" Leupold (born 1942), German footballer
 Jacob Leupold (1674 - 1727), German physicist, scientist, and mathematician
 Markus Fredrick Leupold (1876 - 1944), Co-Founder of Leupold & Voelpel now Leupold & Stevens
 Matthias Leupold (born 1959, Berlin), German photographer
 Theodor Leupold (19th century), German cyclist

Leupoldt
 Johann Michael Leupoldt

German-language surnames